Niels Christian Kold Jørgensen (born 24 January 1971) is a Danish former professional footballer who played as a goalkeeper. He competed in the men's tournament at the 1992 Summer Olympics.

References

1971 births
Living people
Footballers from Aarhus
Association football goalkeepers
Danish men's footballers
Danish Superliga players
AaB Fodbold players
Aarhus Gymnastikforening players
Aarhus Fremad players
Denmark international footballers
Olympic footballers of Denmark
Footballers at the 1992 Summer Olympics